Sadhu Ram Sharma  (born 25 May 1921) is an Indian politician who was the leader of the Indian National Congress party from Haryana, a state in the Punjab region of India. He was a member of the Rajya Sabha in the Indian Parliament. A noted Gandhi loyalist, he rose in political circles to become one of the most powerful men in Haryana.

Personal life
Sadhu Ram Sharma was born into a Sharma family from Haryana in 1921. He received a B.Sc.(agri.) from Cornell University in the United States.

His brother Shankar Dayal Sharma (19 August 1918 – 26 December 1999) was the 9th President of the Republic of India, serving from 1992 to 1997. Sadhu Ram Sharma is also the father of Ashok Kumar Sharma, an MP in the Rajya Sabha under the banner of the Bharatiya Janata Party.

Political initiation
During the 1940s Sadhu Ram Sharma was involved in the struggle for Indian independence from Britain. He joined the Indian National Congress with his brother Shanker Dayal Sharma. In the 1960s he became a member of the Rajya Sabha in the Indian Parliament, under the banner of the Indian National Congress.

References

1921 births
Possibly living people
Cornell University College of Agriculture and Life Sciences alumni
Indian National Congress politicians from Haryana
Rajya Sabha members from Haryana